The 1975 Tennessee Volunteers football team (variously "Tennessee", "UT" or the "Vols") represented the University of Tennessee in the 1975 NCAA Division I football season. Playing as a member of the Southeastern Conference (SEC), the team was led by head coach Bill Battle, in his sixth year, and played their home games at Neyland Stadium in Knoxville, Tennessee. They finished the season with a record of seven wins and five losses (7–5 overall, 3–3 in the SEC). The Volunteers offense scored 253 points while the defense allowed 193 points.

Schedule

Roster

Team players drafted into the NFL

Reference:

References

Tennessee
Tennessee Volunteers football seasons
Tennessee Volunteers football